"Gingerbread" is episode eleven of season three of the television show Buffy the Vampire Slayer. It was written by Thania St. John and Jane Espenson, directed by James Whitmore, Jr., and first broadcast on January 12, 1999.

Plot
While waiting in the park for Buffy, her mother Joyce discovers the bodies of two dead children. At school the next day, Buffy shows Giles a symbol which was visible on the hands of the two children. He tells her that demons do not use symbols, and that it is no doubt occult-related. This angers Buffy, as Slayers are forbidden to harm humans, even dark witches.

At lunch, Buffy tells the Scooby Gang about the murders. Joyce shows up and announces that there will be a vigil at City Hall that night. Many concerned parents attend the vigil, including Willow's mother. Mayor Wilkins says a few words before Joyce gives a speech about how the people of Sunnydale must take back their city from the monsters, witches, and slayers.

Later, Michael, Amy, and Willow perform a spell in a circle that surrounds the symbol Buffy saw on the children's hands. Buffy finds the symbol in one of Willow's notebooks. Willow explains that the symbol is part of a protection spell for Buffy's upcoming birthday.

Meanwhile, all the school lockers are searched for witch-related material, and Giles's occult books are seized by police. Amy and Willow are taken to Principal Snyder's office for questioning.

At Buffy's home, Joyce forbids Buffy to see Willow anymore, takes credit for the locker searches and states that Buffy's slaying does Sunnydale no good. The ghosts of two children appear to Joyce and tell her that she has to hurt the "bad girls".

At the park, Buffy talks with Angel, who convinces her not to give up fighting. When he makes a passing remark about the children and their parents, Buffy is struck by the thought that the children's parents were never seen or mentioned, and the fact that no one knows the children's names. After using the Internet to contact Willow, the Scooby Gang learns that every fifty years throughout history, the murdered bodies of two nameless children have been found, resulting in peaceful communities being torn apart by vigilante chaos. The earliest record dating from Germany during 1649, where a cleric from the Black Forest discovered the corpses of "Hans and Greta Strauss", inspiring the fairy tale of Hansel and Gretel. Giles explains that certain demons thrive on watching humans destroy each other through persecution and ignorance. According to Giles, this is what set off the Salem Witch Trials.

Buffy and Giles are knocked out with chloroform by Joyce and her friends, at the behest of the two children. Amy, Willow, and Buffy are taken to City Hall where they are tied to wooden posts surrounded by books. Cordelia finds Giles unconscious, wakes him and they rush to City Hall. Just as Buffy wakes up, her mother lights books on fire, sentencing the three girls to death by burning at the stake. Amy escapes by transforming herself into a rat.

At City Hall, Cordelia uses a fire hose to put the burning stakes out. The two children transform into a large demon which charges at Buffy. She breaks her stake and uses it to impale the demon.

Buffy and Willow play with Amy the rat and are looking for a way to restore her to human form.  Buffy's and Willow's mothers have forgotten about what happened but Willow's mom remembers Willow said she is dating Oz, and he has been invited to dinner.

Reception

Noel Murray of The A.V. Club praised "Gingerbread" for its humorous dialogue and the way it progressed the story arc, but criticized the action as slow and repetitive.

References

External links

 

Buffy the Vampire Slayer (season 3) episodes
1999 American television episodes
Television episodes written by Jane Espenson
Works based on Hansel and Gretel
Television episodes about child abduction
Television episodes about witchcraft
Witch hunting in fiction